William Hoad (7 October 1885 – 24 January 1920) was a Barbadian cricketer. He played in six first-class matches for Barbados and Trinidad and Tobago from 1901 to 1906.

See also
 List of Barbadian representative cricketers

References

External links
 

1885 births
1920 deaths
Barbadian cricketers
Barbados cricketers
Trinidad and Tobago cricketers
People from Saint Michael, Barbados